Stephen Maybery (born September 1949) is an author specialising in political satire. For most of his life, he has been a civil engineer and an avid traveler. He grew up and obtained his education in South Wales but currently resides in London. 

Maybery visited Iran during the Iranian Revolution, and Iraq, where he joined the building of nuclear fallout shelters for Ba'ath Party officials. 

His first book, My Prime Ministers And I, came out in May 2004. His second book, Gods Knaves And Scoundrels, was published in December 2009.

Works
Novels:
 My Prime Ministers And I
 Gods Knaves And Scoundrels

Plays:
 Life, Death And The Dear Departed
 Mary, Mary Quite Contrary

References

External links 
 Maybery's blog

Welsh novelists
Welsh dramatists and playwrights
Welsh satirists
Living people
1949 births